Greenway was a village in south central Manitoba, Canada. It was named after Thomas Greenway, premier of Manitoba from 1888 to 1900. It was built as a result of the Canadian Northern Pacific Railway's Morris Branch being run through the Rural Municipality of Argyle in 1890.

See also
List of regions of Manitoba
List of rural municipalities in Manitoba

References

Former villages in Manitoba
Unincorporated communities in Westman Region